The Bahram Khan family is a major political family from Charsadda, Khyber Pakhtunkhwa province of Pakistan.

Family tree
The members of Bahram Khan family who have been active in politics are:

 Khan Abdul Bahram Khan, the founder of the family
 Khan Abdul Jabbar Khan (1882–1958) ("Dr. Khan Sahib"), pioneer in the Indian Independence Movement and a Pakistani politician, son of Khan Abdul Bahram Khan
 Abdul Ghaffar Khan (1890–1988), also known as Bacha Khan, independence activist, son of Khan Abdul Bahram Khan
 Abdul Ghani Khan (1914–1996), widely considered as one of the best Pashto language poets of the 20th century, son of Abdul Ghaffar Khan
 Abdul Wali Khan (1917–2006), secular democratic socialist leader and opponent of the British Raj, son of Abdul Ghaffar Khan
 Abdul Ali Khan (1922-1997), educationist, the youngest son of Abdul Ghaffar Khan
 Nasim Wali Khan, politician and wife of Abdul Wali Khan
 Asfandyar Wali Khan (born 1949), politician, son of Abdul Wali Khan
 Sangeen Wali Khan (1959–2008), politician, son of Abdul Wali Khan
 Aimal Wali Khan (born 1986), politician, son of Asfandyar Wali Khan
 Lawangeen Wali Khan (born 1988), politician, son of Sangeen Wali Khan

See also
 Pakistan
 Pashtun people
 Khyber Pakhtunkhwa
 Khudai Khidmatgar
 Awami National Party

Political families of Pakistan
Pashtun people
Bahram Khan family